Forzano is a surname. Notable people with the surname include:

Giovacchino Forzano (1884–1970), Italian playwright, librettist, stage director, and film director 
Rick Forzano (1928–2019), American football coach 

Italian-language surnames